is a Japanese politician of the Liberal Democratic Party, a member of the House of Representatives in the Diet (national legislature). A native of Tokyo and graduate of Sophia University, he was elected to the House of Representatives for the first time in 2005. He is an assenter of "The Truth about Nanjing(movie)."

References

External links 
  in Japanese.

Members of the House of Representatives (Japan)
Koizumi Children
Sophia University alumni
People from Ōita Prefecture
Living people
1957 births
Liberal Democratic Party (Japan) politicians